Capitol 6 was a rock band based in Vancouver, British Columbia, Canada.

History
Capitol 6 were formed in Vancouver, British Columbia in 2011 and later that year released their first EP, 'Captain Rehab'. In August that year, they released the 'Fever/Henry's Opus' single as a free download on their Bandcamp page. Early members were guitarist and vocalist Malcolm Jack, bassist Matt Krysko,  and keyboardist Henry Beckwith. By 2012 they were joined by guitarist Chris Alarcon and Drummer Neil Corbett.

In 2012 Capitol 6 released their first full-length album, titled 'Pretty Lost'. The album held eight tracks. They released their first single from the album, 'Cold Ride', and included music videos for 'Playing Dead' and 'Just A Puzzle'.  'Just A Puzzle' was featured in the Canadian science fiction programme Continuum (specifically episode 4, entitled 'Matter of Time').

In January 2013, they released another single titled 'No One Came', which featured a music video directed by David Biddle.

On 4 July 2013, Capitol 6 announced on their Facebook page that their final show was on 10 July.

Discography

Studio albums
Pretty Lost (12 June 2012)

EPs
Captain Rehab (3 May 2011)
Fever/Henry's Opus (9 August 2011)

Singles
No One Came (5 January 2013)

References 

Canadian alternative rock groups
Musical groups from Vancouver
Musical groups established in 2011
Musical groups disestablished in 2013
2011 establishments in British Columbia
2013 disestablishments in British Columbia